Armando Lambruschini (June 15, 1924 – August 15, 2004) was an admiral in the Argentine Navy.

Life and career
Lambruschini enrolled at the Argentine Naval School in 1942, and graduated as a midshipman in 1946. He was later named Captain of the Navy, and served in that capacity aboard the cruiser ARA General Belgrano.
 
Lambruschini was promoted to Head of the Navy Chiefs of Staff in 1975, a rank second only to Admiral Emilio Massera in that branch. (Both men graduated from the Naval School in the same year.)  His prominent role in the National Reorganization Process that took power in the March 1976 coup allowed him to oversee an ambitious modernization plan for the navy. 

Ongoing friction between President Jorge Videla and Admiral Massera prompted the latter's September 15, 1978 replacement by Lambruschini, who served in that capacity until September 11, 1981.

Lambruschini's role in the Dirty War during the dictatorship led to  numerous criminal charges including murder, illegal arrest, torture, theft and forgery. Indicted during the historic Trial of the Juntas of 1985, Lambruschini was found guilty on December 9 and sentenced to 8 years's imprisonment.

In 1990, he was among those pardoned by President Carlos Menem, and was freed from prison and had his rank of admiral reinstated. He later faced civil lawsuits, and in November 1994 was ordered to pay (with Massera) $1 million to a victim whose family was abducted and murdered in 1976.
  
In 1997, Italian courts tried him for crimes in absentia; and in 2003 he was accused of further cases of human rights violations. His advanced age, close to 80, afforded him the benefit of house arrest. He died on August 15, 2004.

His 15-year-old daughter Paula was murdered in August 1978 when a bomb was planted under Lambruschini's bed by Lucila Adela Revora, a member of the Montoneros guerrillas. Two neighbors also died in the explosion.

Sources

1924 births
2004 deaths
Argentine people of Italian descent
Argentine Navy admirals
Argentine people convicted of murder
Burials at La Chacarita Cemetery